Wadena Municipal Airport  is a public airport located  west of the central business district of Wadena, a city in Otter Tail County, Minnesota, United States. It is owned by the City of Wadena.

Although most U.S. airports use the same three-letter location identifier for the FAA and IATA, Wadena Municipal Airport is assigned ADC by the FAA but has no designation from the IATA (which assigned ADC to Andakombe, Papua New Guinea).

Facilities and aircraft 
For the 12-month period ending August 31, 2005, the airport had 5,410 aircraft operations: 99.9% general aviation and 0.1% military.

The Wadena City counsel unanimously accepted a bid for the construction of a turf crosswind runway on June 25, 2020.

Cargo

References

External links 
Wadena Municipal Airport at City of Wadena website
  at Minnesota Airport Directory

Airports in Minnesota
Buildings and structures in Otter Tail County, Minnesota
Transportation in Otter Tail County, Minnesota